Perry's Victory and International Peace Memorial commemorates the Battle of Lake Erie that took place near Ohio's South Bass Island, in which Commodore Oliver Hazard Perry led a fleet to victory in one of the most decisive naval battles to occur in the War of 1812.  Located on an isthmus on the island, the memorial also celebrates the lasting peace between Britain, Canada, and the United States that followed the war.

Overview
A  monument — the world's tallest Doric column — was constructed in Put-in-Bay, Ohio by a multi-state commission from 1912 to 1915 "to inculcate the lessons of international peace by arbitration and disarmament." The memorial was designed after an international competition from which the winning design by Joseph H. Freelander and A.D. Seymour was chosen.

Perry's Victory and International Peace Memorial was established to honor those who fought in the Battle of Lake Erie during the War of 1812, and to celebrate the long-lasting peace among Britain, Canada and the U.S. The Memorial column, rising over Lake Erie, is situated five miles from the US-Canadian border.

Although the monument bears the name of Oliver Hazard Perry, six officers slain during the battle are interred under its rotunda, Perry himself is buried in Newport, Rhode Island.  Beneath the stone floor of the monument lie the remains of those three American officers and three British officers. Carved into the walls inside the rotunda are the names of soldiers and sailors who were killed or injured in the Battle of Lake Erie and the text of the Rush-Bagot Treaty.

The Doric Column is the only international peace memorial in the United States National Park System and stands 47 feet taller than the Statue of Liberty in New York Harbor. The upper deck platform is 12 feet higher than the statue of Liberty's torch.

To visit the observation deck near the top, visitors must walk up 37 steps, pay the admission cost ($10.00 cash, card, or check for adults 16 and older starting 2019 season, 15 and younger are free) then a National Park Ranger will transport them by elevator to the top.  Rangers are stationed at the observation deck to answer questions and speak about the history and surrounding area. Views span Lake Erie, the islands and mainland of Ohio, and nearby islands in Ontario, including Middle Island, the southernmost point of land in Canada, and part of Point Pelee National Park.

The column is among the tallest monuments in the United States (the Gateway Arch, San Jacinto Monument, and Washington Monument are taller).  Although substantially completed in 1915, funding problems prevented the proper completion of a fully realized memorial complex.  In 1919 the federal government assumed control of the monument and provided additional funding.  The official dedication was celebrated on July 31, 1931. In 2002, $2.4 million was spent on a new visitor center. The memorial is visited by 200,000 people each year.

Administrative history
Established as Perry's Victory and International Peace Memorial National Monument by Franklin D. Roosevelt on June 2, 1936 (Proclamation No. 2182); redesignated a National Memorial and renamed on October 26, 1972.  As with all historic areas administered by the National Park Service, the memorial was listed on the National Register of Historic Places on October 15, 1966; the listing's boundaries were increased in 2015.

2013 US quarter coin

Perry's Victory and International Peace Memorial were selected to represent Ohio in the multi-year America the Beautiful Quarters series, honoring a national site from every US state, district, or territory. Its design shows Oliver Hazard Perry on the coin's reverse, depicting the site's statue of Perry with the International Peace Memorial in the distance. The design was selected from eleven proposals.

Structural concerns
The Memorial had been closed for most of the summer of 2006 after a 500-pound (230 kg) piece of granite broke off the southeast face of the observation deck, falling  and leaving a crater in the plaza in June. No one was injured. Following a structural assessment that deemed it safe for visitors, the memorial reopened on August 26, 2006, with a fence surrounding it.

The monument closed on September 30, 2009 for repairs, and reopened on July 12, 2012.

The monument was closed once again for the summer of 2017 for repairs and cleaning.

Interactions with the Boy Scouts of America
Annually, the monument site hosts a large Boy Scout camporee hosted by Troop 360 from Port Clinton, Ohio. This camporee attracts a large amount of scout troops that camp by the monument grounds. This event, however, is highly susceptible to weather conditions, and has not been held due to flooding concerns.

Gallery

See also
 Other Navy memorials
 List of national memorials of the United States

References

Further reading
 Downloadable resources regarding Oliver Hazard Perry, including orations at the opening of the Put-in-Bay monument, American Library Association.
 The National Parks: Index 2001–2003. Washington: U.S. Department of the Interior.

External links

 National Park Service: Perry's Victory and International Peace Memorial
 Perry's Monument Photo Gallery
 Entry at Skyscraperpage.com

National Memorials of the United States
Military monuments and memorials in the United States
Landmarks of the War of 1812
Peace parks
Monumental columns in the United States
Monuments and memorials in Ohio
National Park Service areas in Ohio
Monuments and memorials on the National Register of Historic Places in Ohio
Protected areas of Ottawa County, Ohio
National Register of Historic Places in Ottawa County, Ohio
Protected areas established in 1936
Victory monuments
Buildings and structures in Ottawa County, Ohio
Tourist attractions in Ottawa County, Ohio
Buildings and structures completed in 1936
1936 sculptures
Peace monuments and memorials